Tanbaku Kar-e Ali (also Romanized as Tanbākū Kār-e ʿAlī; also known as Tanbākū Kār-e Yek) is a village in Margha Rural District, in the Central District of Izeh County, Khuzestan Province, Iran. At the 2006 census, its population was 42, in 6 families.

References 

Populated places in Izeh County